State Route 97 (SR 97) is a rural state highway located entirely in Franklin County in southern Middle Tennessee.

Route description 

SR 97 traverses mainly rural areas of southwestern Franklin County as its northern terminus is located at Huntland with a junction with SR 122 just south of that route's intersection with US 64 (SR 15).

Major intersections

References 

097
097